John Hyde (11 September 1827 – 7 October 1893) was an English cricketer. Hyde's batting and bowling styles are unknown. He was born at Pulborough, Sussex.

Hyde made his first-class debut for Sussex against an All England Eleven at Priory Park, Chichester in 1852. He made five further first-class appearances for Sussex in that season, the last of which came against Surrey. In his six first-class matches for Sussex, he took 4 wickets at an approximate average of 32.50, while the most wickets he took in a single innings is two, his best figures for Sussex were not recorded. With the bat, he scored a total of 20 runs at a batting average of 2.85, with a high score of 7 not out. Hyde also made a single first-class appearance for a combined Kent and Sussex team against an All England Eleven in 1853, taking a single wicket in the match. His final first-class appearance also came in that year, for a United England Eleven against the Gentlemen of England, in which he took 5 wickets and his career best bowling figures of 4/8.

He died in Nuthurst, Sussex on 7 October 1893 aged 66.

References

External links
John Hyde at ESPNcricinfo
John Hyde at CricketArchive

1827 births
1893 deaths
People from Pulborough
English cricketers
Sussex cricketers
United All-England Eleven cricketers